William Oakley (6 May 1868 – unknown) was an English cricketer active in first-class play from 1892 to 1894 who played for Lancashire. 

He was born in Shrewsbury.

He appeared in 24 first-class matches as a bowler of left arm medium pace. He scored 144 runs with a highest score of 24 and held 21 catches. He took 55 wickets with a best analysis of six for 50. 

Below first-class cricket, Oakley also played for the Liverpool and District teams as well as at county level for Shropshire between 1891 and 1905, playing in 34 matches where he made a total 394 runs and took 239 wickets. He was engaged as a professional player for the cricket clubs of Sefton in Liverpool, Todmorden and Scarborough.

Notes

1868 births
Date of death unknown
English cricketers
Lancashire cricketers
Liverpool and District cricketers
Sportspeople from Shrewsbury